Burr Oak Township may refer to:

 Burr Oak Township, Mitchell County, Iowa
 Burr Oak Township, Winneshiek County, Iowa, in Winneshiek County, Iowa
 Burr Oak Township, Doniphan County, Kansas
 Burr Oak Township, Jewell County, Kansas
 Burr Oak Township, Michigan
 Burr Oak Township, Lincoln County, Missouri
 Burr Oak Township, Beadle County, South Dakota, in Beadle County, South Dakota

Township name disambiguation pages